The 130th season of the Victorian Football League/Victorian Football Association was held in 2011.

Teams
The league contracted from fourteen teams to thirteen, after the Gold Coast Football Club left and entered the Australian Football League. The fledgling Gold Coast club had used the 2009 TAC Cup season and the 2010 VFL season as preparation for joining the AFL. There was originally speculation that the Greater Western Sydney Giants, which had played TAC Cup in 2010 and was set to join the AFL in 2012, may have spent the 2011 season in the VFL under a similar plan, but instead the club opted to play in the North East Australian Football League.

The VFL continued to serve as both the top state-level football league in Victoria, and as a reserves competition for Victorian-based clubs in the Australian Football League, as had been the case since 2000. The affiliation agreements between VFL and AFL clubs were unchanged from 2010.

The top three teams from 2010 – North Ballarat, Northern Bullants and Williamstown – competed in the inaugural Foxtel Cup competition, with Williamstown winning the event.

Port Melbourne dominated the 2011 season, winning twenty-one games in a row to win the premiership undefeated. In the home-and-away season, the Borough finished with a record of 18–0, finishing four games clear atop the ladder; it was the first time a club had finished the home-and-away season undefeated since Geelong West in 1972 Division 2, and the first to do so in the top division since Williamstown in 1957. The Borough maintained its undefeated record through the finals to claim the premiership, replicating the feat of Geelong West's 1972 team, but becoming the first team to achieve the feat in the top division since North Melbourne in 1918.

Ladder

Finals

Grand Final

Awards
The J. J. Liston Trophy was won for the second consecutive year by Shane Valenti (Port Melbourne), who polled 25 votes. Valenti finished ahead of Matthew Bate (Casey Scorpions), who was second with 15 votes, and Ben Jolley (Williamstown), who was third with 13 votes.
The Frosty Miller Medal was won by Patrick Rose (Port Melbourne), who kicked 67 goals for the season.
The Fothergill-Round Medal was won by Ahmed Saad (Northern Bullants)
The top three teams, Port Melbourne, Williamstown and Werribee, qualified for the 2012 Foxtel Cup tournament.
The reserves premiership was won by Box Hill. Box Hill 18.10 (118) defeated Coburg 7.11 (53) in the Grand Final, played as a curtain-raiser to the seniors first preliminary final on 17 September at TEAC Oval.

See also 
 List of VFA/VFL premiers
 Australian Rules Football
 Victorian Football League
 Australian Football League
 2011 AFL season

References

External links
AFL Victoria website
Official VFL website

Victorian Football League seasons
VFL